Bradwardine can refer to the following:

 Thomas Bradwardine, English archbishop.
 The Baron of Bradwardine, a character from the novel Waverley by Sir Walter Scott. His only child is his daughter, Rose Bradwardine.
 The former village of Bradwardine, Manitoba, Canada.